Pleasant Street School may refer to:

in the United States
 Pleasant Street School (Ayer, Massachusetts), listed on the NRHP in Massachusetts
 Pleasant Street School (Spencer, Massachusetts), listed on the NRHP in Massachusetts